Pollenia alajensis is a species of cluster fly in the family Polleniidae.

Distribution
Kyrgyzstan.

References

Polleniidae
Insects described in 1926
Diptera of Asia